This is a list of auto racing and moto racing circuits sorted by country.

Note: Circuits carrying a "" were, are, or will be hosting Formula One and/or MotoGP Grand Prix.

Andorra

Ice racing circuits
Pas de la Casa (Pic Maiá), Andorra la Vella

Angola

Permanent circuits
Autódromo de Benguela, Benguela
Autódromo de Luanda, Luanda

Argentina

Permanent Circuits
 Allen, Allen, Rio Negro
 Autódromo Aldea Romana de Bahía Blanca, Bahía Blanca, Buenos Aires
 Autódromo Ciudad de Concordia, Concordia, Entre Ríos
 Autódromo Ciudad de La Rioja, La Rioja
 Autódromo Ciudad de Mar del Plata, Mar del Plata, Buenos Aires
 Autódromo Ciudad de Nueve de Julio, 9 de Julio, Buenos Aires
 Autódromo Ciudad de Oberá, Oberá, Misiones
 Autódromo Ciudad de Paraná, Paraná, Entre Ríos
 Autódromo Ciudad de Pigüé, Pigüé, Buenos Aires
 Autódromo Ciudad de Rafaela, a.k.a. Autódromo Ing. Juan R. Báscolo, Rafaela, Santa Fe
 Autódromo de Concepción del Uruguay, Concepción del Uruguay, Entre Ríos
 Autódromo Eduardo Copello, San Juan
 Autódromo Eusebio Marcilla, Junín, Buenos Aires
 Autódromo General San Martín, Comodoro Rivadavia, Patagonia
 Autódromo Hermanos Emiliozzi, Olavarría, Buenos Aires
 Autódromo Jorge Ángel Pena, San Martín, Mendoza
 Autódromo José Muñiz, Río Gallegos, Santa Cruz
 Autódromo Juan Manuel Fangio, Balcarce, Buenos Aires
 Autódromo Juan María Traverso, San Nicolás de los Arroyos, Buenos Aires
 Autódromo Juan Oria, Marcos Juárez, Córdoba

 Autódromo Luis Rubén Di Palma, Mar de Ajó, Buenos Aires
 Autódromo Mar y Valle, Trelew, Chubut
 Autódromo Martín Miguel de Güemes, Salta
 Autódromo Municipal Juan Manuel Fangio, Rosario, Santa Fe
 Autódromo Oscar Cabalén, Alta Gracia, Córdoba
 Autódromo Parque Ciudad de General Roca, General Roca, Río Negro
 Autódromo Parque Ciudad de Río Cuarto, Río Cuarto, Córdoba
 Autódromo Parque Ciudad de Santa Rosa, Santa Rosa, La Pampa
 Autódromo Parque de la Velocidad de San Jorge, San Jorge, Santa Fe
 Autódromo Parque Provincia del Neuquén, Centenario, Neuquén
 Autódromo Provincia de La Pampa, Toay, La Pampa
 Autódromo Roberto José Mouras, La Plata, Buenos Aires
 Autódromo Rosamonte, Posadas, Misiones
 Autódromo Rosendo Hernández, San Luis, San Luis
 Autódromo Santiago Yaco Guarnieri, Resistencia, Chaco

 Autódromo Viedma, Viedma, Río Negro
 Avellaneda, Santa Fe
 Circuito San Juan Villicum, Albardón, San Juan
 Costanera de Santa Fé, a.k.a. Circuito Carlos Reutemann, a.k.a. Circuito Manuel Belgrano
 Estancia Chica
 Las Flores, Buenos Aires
 Las Paredes, San Rafael, Mendoza
 Miramar, a.k.a. Circuito Roberto Hirch, Buenos Aires
 Pinamar
 Tucumán, San Miguel de Tucumán, Tucumán
 Velociudad Speedcity, Zárate, Buenos Aires

Street circuits
 Autódromo José Carlos Bassi, Villa Mercedes, San Luis
 Gran Premio de Santa Fe, Santa Fe, Santa Fe
 Potrero de los Funes Circuit, San Luis, San Luis
 Puerto Madero Street Circuit, Puerto Madero, Buenos Aires

Aruba
Palomarga International Raceway Park, San Nicolaas

Australia

Permanent circuits
 Baskerville Raceway, Hobart, Tasmania
 Broadford Track, Victoria
 Calder Park Raceway, Melbourne, Victoria
 Collie Motorplex, Collie, Western Australia
 Hidden Valley Raceway, Darwin, Northern Territory
 Lakeside Park, Brisbane, Queensland
 Mallala Motor Sport Park, Mallala, South Australia
 McNamara Park, Mount Gambier, South Australia
 Morgan Park Raceway, Warwick, Queensland

 Queensland Raceway, Ipswich, Queensland
 Sandown Raceway, Melbourne, Victoria

 Symmons Plains Raceway, Launceston, Tasmania
 The Bend Motorsport Park, Tailem Bend, South Australia
 Wanneroo Raceway, Perth, Western Australia
 Winton Motor Raceway, Benalla, Victoria

Under construction
 Circuit Italia – Balickera, New South Wales
 DriveIt NQ – Calcium, Queensland

Street circuits

 Mount Panorama Circuit, Bathurst, New South Wales
 Newcastle Street Circuit, Newcastle, New South Wales
 Surfers Paradise Street Circuit, Surfers Paradise, Queensland
 Townsville Street Circuit, Townsville, Queensland

Speedways

 Archerfield Speedway, Brisbane, Queensland
 Arunga Park Speedway, Alice Springs, Northern Territory
 Avalon Raceway, Avalon, Victoria
 Borderline Speedway, Mount Gambier, South Australia
 Brisbane International Speedway, Brisbane, Queensland
 Bunbury City Speedway, Bunbury, Western Australia
 Charlton Raceway, Toowoomba, Queensland
 Dubbo Speedway, Dubbo, New South Wales
 Ellenbrook Speedway, Bullsbrook, Western Australia
 Gilgandra Speedway, Gilgandra, New South Wales
 Gillman Speedway, Adelaide, South Australia
 Gympie Speedway, Gympie, Queensland
 Hobart International Speedway, New Norfolk, Tasmania
 Kalgoorlie International Speedway, Kalgoorlie, Western Australia
 Northline Speedway, Darwin, Northern Territory
 Olympic Park Speedway, Mildura, Victoria
 Parramatta City Raceway, Sydney, New South Wales
 Perth Motorplex, Kwinana Beach, Western Australia
 Pioneer Park Speedway, Brandon, Queensland
 Premier Speedway, Warrnambool, Victoria
 Riverview Speedway, Murray Bridge, South Australia
 Rockhampton Speedway, Rockhampton, Queensland
 Sapphire Speedway, Bega, New South Wales
 Speedway City, Adelaide, South Australia
 Townsville Motorcycle Club, Lang Park facility, Woodstock, Queensland
 Western Speedway, Hamilton, Victoria

Drag strips
 Adelaide International Raceway, Adelaide, South Australia
 Alice Springs Inland Dragway, Alice Springs, Northern Territory
 Bairnsdale Dragway, Bairnsdale, Victoria
 Benaraby Raceway, Gladstone, Queensland
 Calder Park Raceway, Melbourne, Victoria
 Canberra International Dragway, Fairbairn, Australian Capital Territory
 Collie Motorplex, Collie, Western Australia
 Coonawarra Dragway, Coonawarra, South Australia
 Corinda Race Track, Charters Towers, Queensland
 Heathcote Park Raceway, Heathcote, Victoria
 Hidden Valley Raceway, Darwin, Northern Territory
 Ironbark Raceway, Roma, Queensland
 Mildura Sunset Strip, Mildura, Victoria
 Palmyra Dragway, Mackay, Queensland
 Perth Motorplex, Kwinana Beach, Western Australia
 South Coast Raceway, Portland, Victoria
 Springmount Raceway, Mareeba, Queensland
 Steel City Raceway, Whyalla, South Australia
 Tarmak Dragway, Launceston, Tasmania
 Townsville Dragway, Townsville, Queensland (closed 25 August 2012)
 Warwick Dragway, Warwick, Queensland
 Western Sydney International Dragway, Sydney, New South Wales
 Wilby Park Raceway, Wilby, Victoria
 Willowbank Raceway, Ipswich, Queensland

Hillclimbs
 Collingrove Hillclimb, Angaston, South Australia
 Haunted Hills Racetrack, Gippsland, Victoria
 Mount Buller, Victoria
 Mount Cotton Hillclimb, Mount Cotton, Queensland
 Mount Majura Hillclimb, Mount Majura, Australian Capital Territory
 Mount Tarrengower, Maldon, Victoria
 Rob Roy, Christmas Hills, Victoria
 Highclere Hillclimb, Highclere, Tasmania
 Lake Barrington Hillclimb, Lake Barrington, Tasmania

Inactive/closed tracks
 Adelaide International Raceway, Adelaide, South Australia  (still has limited use)
 Amaroo Park, Sydney, New South Wales
 Aspendale Racecourse, Aspendale, Victoria
 Ballarat Airport, Ballarat, Victoria
 Brenock Park Speedway, Ferntree Gully, Victoria
 Brisbane Exhibition Ground, Brisbane, Queensland
 Canberra International Dragway, Fairburn, Canberra, Australian Capital Territory
 Canberra Street Circuit, Canberra, Australian Capital Territory
 Castlereagh International Dragway, Sydney, New South Wales
 Catalina Park, Katoomba, New South Wales
 Caversham Airfield, Caversham, Western Australia
 Claremont Speedway, Perth, Western Australia
 Gnoo Blas Motor Racing Circuit, Orange, New South Wales
 Homebush Street Circuit, Sydney Olympic Park, New South Wales
 Hume Weir Motor Racing Circuit, Albury-Wodonga, New South Wales
 King Edward Park Hillclimb, Newcastle, New South Wales
 Liverpool Speedway, Sydney, New South Wales
 Lobethal Circuit, Lobethal, South Australia
 Longford Circuit, Longford, Tasmania
 Lowood Circuit, Tarampa, Queensland
 Macarthur Park Street Circuit, Australian Capital Territory (motorcycle/sidecar racing only)
 Oran Park Raceway, Sydney, New South Wales
 Parramatta Park, Parramatta, New South Wales
 Penguin Speedway, Penguin, Tasmania
 Port Wakefield Circuit, Port Wakefield, South Australia
 Quorn Hall, Campbell Town, Tasmania
 Rowley Park Speedway, Adelaide, South Australia
 Surfers Paradise International Raceway, Gold Coast, Queensland
 Sydney Showground Speedway, Sydney, New South Wales
 Templestowe hillclimb racetrack, Melbourne, Victoria
 The Vale Circuit, Bathurst, New South Wales.
 Tralee Speedway, Queanbeyan, New South Wales
 Tunbridge Airfield, Tunbridge, Tasmania
 Valleyfield Airfield, Epping Forest, Tasmania
 Wakefield Park, Goulburn, New South Wales
 Warwick Farm Raceway, Sydney, New South Wales
 Woodside, Woodside, South Australia

Austria

Permanent Circuits 
 Nordring, Fuglau
PS Racing Centre Greinbach

 Wachauring, Melk

Inactive Circuits 

1st of May Race, Salzburg
Aspern airfield, Vienna
Ennstalring, Großraming (still used for classic motorcycle races)
Innsbruck-Kranebitten Airport, Innsbruck
Linz-Hörsching Airport, Hörsching
Schwanenstadt Street Race, Schwanenstadt (still used for classic motorcycle races)
St. Pölten Street Race, Sankt Pölten
Tulln-Langenlebarn Airport, Tulln
Traiskirchen Street Race, Traiskirchen

Azerbaijan

 Baku World Challenge, Baku

Bahrain

Barbados
 Bushy Park, Barbados

Belgium

Street circuits
 Circuit de Chimay, Chimay Semi-permanent street circuit

Permanent circuits

 Circuit Jules Tacheny Mettet, Mettet Permanent circuit to replace the Mettet street circuit. Opened in 2010.

 Warneton Speedway, Warneton

Rallycross circuits
 Duivelsbergcircuit, Maasmechelen Very known in the world of rallycross.
 Arendonk Glosso Circuit, Arendok

Inactive tracks
 Mettet Street Circuit, Inactive as 2005

Brazil
 Autódromo Dito Gianetti (ECPA) – Piracicaba, São Paulo
 Autódromo Geraldo Backer – Serra, Espírito Santo
 Autódromo Internacional Ayrton Senna (Caruaru) – Caruaru, Pernambuco

 Autódromo Internacional Ayrton Senna (Londrina) – Londrina, Paraná
 Autódromo Internacional da Paraíba – São Miguel do Taipu, Paraíba
 Autódromo Internacional de Campo Grande – Campo Grande, Mato Grosso do Sul
 Autódromo Internacional de Cascavel (Autódromo Zilmar Beux) – Cascavel, Paraná
 Autódromo Internacional de Curitiba (Circuito Raul Boesel) – Pinhais, Paraná
 Autódromo Internacional de Guaporé (Autódromo Nelson Luiz Barro) – Guaporé, Rio Grande do Sul
 Autódromo Internacional de Santa Cruz do Sul – Santa Cruz do Sul, Rio Grande do Sul
 Autódromo Internacional de Tarumã – Viamão, Rio Grande do Sul
 Autódromo Internacional Nelson Piquet (Brasília) – Brasília, Distrito Federal (Brazil)
 Autódromo Internacional Virgílio Távora – Eusébio, Ceará
 Autódromo Potenza Eireli - Lima Duarte, Minas Gerais
 Plan Speed Park – Campos dos Goytacazes, Rio de Janeiro

 Autódromo Velo Città - Mogi Guaçu, São Paulo
 Circuito Cacá Bueno - Rio de Janeiro
 Circuito dos Cristais – Curvelo, Minas Gerais
 São Paulo Street Circuit – São Paulo, São Paulo
 Speed Park Franca – Franca, São Paulo
 Velopark – Nova Santa Rita, Rio Grande do Sul

Inactive tracks
 Araraquara
 Barra da Tijuca (Guanabara)
 Betim
 Cavalhada (Circuito da Pedra Redonda / Porto Alegre)
 Cavalo de Aço
 Flamengo
 Florianópolis
 Foz do Iguaçu
 Fundão (Ilha do Governador / Rio de Janeiro)
 Gávea (Boa Vista)
 Itapecerica
 Juiz de Fora
 Maracanã
 Mineirão (Belo Horizonte)
 Pernambuco
 Petropolis
 Piracicaba
 Recife

 São Paulo (Jardim América)
 Salvador
 Enseada do Suá – Vitória, Espírito Santo
 Via Expressa Sul – Florianópolis, Santa Catarina
 Cidade Baixa – Salvador, Bahia
 Circuito Ayrton Senna – Salvador, Bahia
 Saturnino Rangel Mauro – Vila Velha, Espírito Santo

Bulgaria
Only one race track - "Drakon Race Track", near the village Kaloyanovo, Plovdiv Province

Canada

Permanent circuits
 Area 27, Oliver, British Columbia
 Atlantic Motorsport Park, Shubenacadie, Nova Scotia
 Autodrome Saint-Eustache, Saint-Eustache, Quebec
 Calabogie Motorsports Park, Calabogie, Ontario

 Circuit ICAR, Mirabel, Quebec

 Mission Raceway Park, Mission, British Columbia
 Shannonville Motorsport Park, Belleville, Ontario
 Toronto Motorsports Park, Cayuga, Ontario
 Vancouver Island Motorsport Park, Victoria, British Columbia

Street circuits

 Circuit Trois-Rivières, Trois-Rivières, Quebec
 Honda Indy Toronto, Toronto
 Molson Indy Vancouver, Vancouver

Speedways
 Autodrome Chaudière, Vallée-Jonction, Quebec
 Autodrome Montmagny, Montmagny, Quebec
 Wyant Group Raceway, Saskatoon, Saskatchewan (oval track racing)
 Barrie Speedway, Oro-Medonte, Ontario
 Bridge County Raceway, Lethbridge, Alberta
 Capital City Speedway, Ashton, Ontario
 Castrol Raceway, Edmonton, Alberta
 Central Alberta Raceways, Rimbey, Alberta
 Circuit Riverside Speedway Ste-Croix, Sainte-Croix, Quebec
 Delaware Speedway, Delaware, Ontario
 Dinosaur Downs Speedway, Drumheller, Alberta
 Edmonton International Raceway, Wetaskiwin, Alberta
 Hythe Motor Speedway, Hythe, Alberta
 Kawartha Speedway, Fraserville, Ontario
 Medicine Hat Speedway, Medicine Hat, Alberta
 Motoplex Speedway, Vernon, British Columbia
 Oyser Bed Raceway, Oyster Bed Bridge, Prince Edward Island
 Petty International Raceway River Glade, New Brunswick
 Race City Motorsport Park, Calgary, Alberta
 Red River Co-op Speedway, Winnipeg, Manitoba
 Riverside Speedway, Antigonish, Nova Scotia
 Rocky Mountain Raceway, Okotoks, Alberta
 Sanair Super Speedway, Saint-Pie, Quebec
 Scotia Speedworld, Enfield, Nova Scotia
 Sangudo Speedway, Sangudo, Alberta
 Speedway 660, Fredericton, New Brunswick
 Speedway Miramichi, Miramichi, New Brunswick
 Thunder Valley Speedway Bishops Fall, Newfoundland
 Yellowhead Raceway, Hinton, Alberta

Drag strips
 Saskatchewan International Raceway (SIR), Saskatoon, Saskatchewan (drag racing)
 Mission Raceway Park, Mission, British Columbia (drag racing)
 Nl'akapxm Eagle Motorplex, Ashcroft, British Columbia (drag racing)

Inactive tracks
 Edmonton Indy, Edmonton, Alberta
 Halifax-Dartmouth International Speedway, Upper Sackville, Nova Scotia
 Westwood Motorsport Park, Coquitlam, British Columbia

Chile

Street circuits
 Circuito Costanera San Martín, Arica
 Circuito Paque Pedro de Valdivia, La Serena
 Circuito Sausalito, Viña del Mar
 Circuito Plaza de Armas, Rengo
 Circuito Dorotea, Puerto Natales

Permanent circuits
 Autódromo Internacional de Codegua, Rancagua
 Autodromo Sergio Santander Benavente, Arica
 Autodromo Bernardo O`Higgins, Iquique
 Autodromo Juvenal Jeraldo, La Serena
 Autodromo La Pampilla, Coquimbo
 Autodromo Villa Olimpica, Quilpué
 Autodromo Leydaring, San Antonio (Ex Pacífico Sport)
 Autódromo Las Vizcachas, Santiago
 Autodromo Municipal, Cabrero
 Autodromo Interlomas, Temuco
 Autodromo Las Vegas de Quilaco, La Unión
 Autodromo Cabo Negro, Punta Arenas

Permanent kart tracks
 Kartodromo Las Carretas, Lampa
 Kartodromo Angel Navarrete, Limache
 Kartodromo La Reina, Santiago
 Kartodromo Siete Puentes, Rancagua
 Kartodromo Mediocampo, Hualpen

Permanent dirt circuits

 Autodromo Topater, Calama
 Autodromo Estacion Paipote, Copiapo
 Autodromo Marañon, Vallenar
 Autodromo Salamanca, Salamanca
 Autodromo La Ligua, La Ligua
 Autodromo Pocuro, Los Andes
 Autodromo Las Coimas, San Felipe
 Autodromo Villa Olimpica, Olmue
 Autodromo Curacavi, Curacavi
 Autodromo Cartagena, Cartagena
 Autodromo El Tabo, El Tabo
 Autodromo Valdivia de Paine, Buin
 Autodromo Lago Rapel, Lago Rapel
 Autodromo Valentin del Barrio, Rengo
 Autodromo Malloa, Malloa
 Autodromo La Encina, La Encina
 Autodromo Teno, Teno
 Autodromo Lorenzo Varoli, Talca
 Autodromo Linares, Linares
 Autodromo Los Maitenes, Chillan Viejo
 Autodromo Miramar (Cosmito), Penco
 Autodromo San Pedro de la Paz, San Pedro de la Paz
 Autodromo Municipal, Yumbel
 Autodromo Los Pumas, Arauco
 Autodromo Los Boldales, Los Angeles
 Autodromo Angol, Angol
 Autodromo San Jose, Traiguen
 Autodromo Padre de las Casas, Temuco
 Autodromo Bajo Pinar, Temuco
 Autodromo Villarica, Villarica
 Autodromo Llau-Llau, Villarica
 Autodromo Parcela Municipal Marcelo Fourcade, Loncoche
 Autodromo Lanco, Lanco
 Autodromo Malalhue, Malalhue
 Autodromo Cancura, Cancura
 Autodromo Tronadores, Huillinco
 Autodromo Rio Negro, Rio Negro
 Autodromo Los Pellines, Llanquihue
 Autodromo Puerto Varas, Puerto Varas
 Autodromo San Juan, Ancud
 Autodromo Bajos de Pindapulli, Dalcahue
 Autodromo Las Quilas de Mocopulli, Dalcahue
 Autodromo Punahuel, Dalcahue
 Autodromo Cucao, Cucao
 Autodromo Oreste Bonicioli, Puerto Natales
 Autodromo Rene Schenider, Porvenir

Inactive tracks
 Autodromo Piedra Roja, Antofagasta
 Autodromo Chanida, Antofagasta
 Autodromo La Portada, Antofagasta
 Autodromo San Carlos de Apoquindo, Santiago
 Circuito Mersan, Santiago
 Base Aérea de El Bosque, Santiago
 Autodromo Peñuelas, Peñuelas
 Autodromo Fernado Vallejos, Placilla
 Base Aérea de Quintero, Quintero
 Autodromo Rocas de Santo Domingo, Santo Domingo
 Base Aeronaval de El Belloto, Quilpué
 Autodromo Gultro, Rancagua
 Autodromo Rancagua, Rancagua
 Autodromo Frutillar Alto, Frutillar
 Autodromo Chinquihue, Puerto Montt
 Parque O'Higgins Circuit, Santiago
 Santiago Street Circuit, Santiago

China

Street circuits
 Beijing International Street Circuit, Beijing
 Beijing Olympic Green Circuit, Beijing
 Jingkai Street Circuit, Beijing
 Haitang Bay Circuit, Sanya
 Shanghai Street Circuit, Shanghai
 Wuhan Street Circuit, Wuhan
 Yancheng Street Circuit, Yancheng
 Zhuhai Street Circuit, Zhuhai

Permanent circuits
 Chengdu Goldenport Circuit, Chengdu
 Goldenport Park Circuit, Beijing
 Guangdong International Circuit, between Zhaoqing and Sanshui
 Guizhou Junchi International Circuit, Guizhou
 Jiangsu Wantrack International Circuit, Nanjing
 Ningbo International Circuit, Beilun
 Ordos International Circuit, Ordos City

 Shanghai Tianma Circuit, Shanghai
 V1 Auto World Tianjin, Tianjin
 Xi'an Automobile University Track, Xi'an
 Zhejiang International Circuit, Shaoxing
 Zhuhai International Circuit, Zhuhai
 Zhuzhou International Circuit, Zhuzhou

Colombia
 Autódromo de Tocancipá, Tocancipá

Inactive/closed tracks
 Autódromo Ricardo Mejía, Bogotá

Costa Rica
 Autódromo La Guácima, Guácima

Croatia

Permanent circuits

Street circuits

Czech Republic

Permanent circuits

 Autodrom Most, Most

Natural circuits
 Horicky okruh, Horice
 Terlicky okruh, Terlicko
 Okruh Frantiska Bartose, Radvanice
 Kyjovsky okruh, Kyjov

Hillclimb tracks
 , Sternberk
 Zamecky vrch, Namest nad Oslavou
 Ustecka 21, Usti nad Orlici

Dirt tracks
 , Sosnova u Ceske Lipy
 Stikovska rokle, Nova Paka
 Sedlcanska kotlina, Sedlcany
 Zavodiste Rachvala, Dolni Bousov
 Cross Arena Prerov, Prerov
 AMK Zalesi Humpolec, Humpolec
 Loketske Serpentiny, Loket

Permanent kart tracks
 Kart Arena Cheb, Cheb
 Autodrom Vysoke Myto, Vysoke Myto
 Autodrom Hradiste, Pisek

Inactive circuits
 Masarykuv okruh, Brno
 Havirov - Senov, Havirov

Denmark
 Jyllands-Ringen, Silkeborg (available only for special events)
 Padborg Park, Padborg
 Ring Djursland, Nimtofte
 Roskilde Ring, Roskilde (demolished)
 Copenhagen Street Circuit, used once a year for classic car racing.
 Aarhus Street Circuit, also used once a year for classic car racing.
 Sjællandsringen, Roskilde primarily used for racing school.
 Roskilde Street Circuit, also used once a year for classic car racing.

Dominican Republic
 Autodrómo Internacional de Las Américas, Santo Domingo

Ecuador
 Autodromo Internacional de Yahuarcocha, Yahuarcocha
 Autódromo de Salinas, La Libertad

El Salvador
 Autódromo Internacional El Jabalí, La Libertad, El Salvador

Estonia
 Audru Ring, Pärnu
Go-Kart circuits:
 Kuningamäe Karting Ring, Jõgeva
 Tabasalu Karting Ring, Tallinn
 Käina Karting Ring, Hiiumaa
 Rapla Karting Ring, Rapla
 Aravete Karting Ring, Järva
Temporary street circuits:
 Linnaring, Tallinn
 Pirita-Kose-Kloostrimetsa Circuit, Tallinn, site of the Estonian Grand Prix
Inactive circuits:
 Kohtla-Järve Karting Ring, Kohtla-Järve
 Kulbilohu Motocross Ring, Konguta

Finland

Permanent circuits
 Ahvenisto Race Circuit, Hämeenlinna
 Alastaro Circuit, Alastaro
 Botniaring Racing Circuit, Jurva
 Kemora Circuit, Veteli
 Helsinki Thunder, Helsinki
 Kymi Ring, Kausala (Kouvola)
 Motopark Raceway, Pieksämäki

Historic circuits
 Keimola Motor Stadium, Vantaa
 Eläintarha, Helsinki, site of the Finnish Grand Prix
 Helsinki Thunder, Helsinki

France

Street circuits
 Circuit de Pau, Pau
 Paris Street Circuit, Paris

Non-permanent circuits
 Circuit de la Sarthe, Le Mans
 Tours Speedway, Tours

Permanent circuits
 Anneau du Rhin, Biltzheim
 Autodrome de Linas-Montlhéry, Montlhéry

 Circuit de Croix-en-Ternois, Croix-en-Ternois
 Circuit d'Albi, Albi

 Circuit de Faleyras
 Circuit de Lédenon, Lédenon

 Circuit du Laquais
 Circuit du Mas du Clos
 Circuit du Val de Vienne, Le Vigeant

 Circuit Pau-Arnos, Pau

Historic circuits

 Circuit de Cadours, Cadours
 Circuit des Platanes, Perpignan
 Circuit des Remparts, Angoulême
 Circuit du Lac, Aix-les-Bains

Georgia
 Rustavi International Motorpark, Rustavi

Germany

Street circuits
 Berlin Street Circuit, Berlin
 Norisring, Nuremberg
 Schleizer Dreieck, Schleiz
 Frohburger Dreieck, Frohburg
 Tempelhof Airport Street Circuit, Berlin

Permanent circuits
 Bilster Berg Drive Resort, Bad Driburg
 Lausitzring, Klettwitz

 Motopark Oschersleben, Oschersleben

 Racepark Meppen, Meppen

Rallycross circuits
 Estering, Buxtehude - used in the FIA World Rallycross Championship from 2014 to 2018

Inactive tracks
 Alemannenring, Singen
 Autobahnspinne, Dresden

 Diepholz Airfield Circuit, Wegberg
 Grenzlandring, Wegberg
 Kassel Calden Airport, Calden
 Mainz Finthen Airport, Mainz

 Regio-Ring, Lahr
 Siegerlandring, Siegerland
 Südschleife, Nürburg
 Zweibrücken Flugplatz, Zweibrücken
 Wunstorf Air Base, Wunstorf

Greece
 Megara Athens Circuit
 Serres Racing Circuit

Guatemala
 Autódromo Pedro Cofiño, Escuintla
 Parque Las Ninfas
 Autodromo Guatemala

Drag strips
 Guatemala Raceway
 Autodromo Guatemala

Inactive tracks
 Base Naval del Pacifico

Guernsey
 Val de Terres, Guernsey

Guyana
 South Dakota Circuit, Georgetown

Hong Kong
 Hong Kong Central Harbourfront Circuit

Hungary
 Ádándi Rallycross, Ádánd, Somogy megye
 Balatonring, Sávoly
 Budapest Street Circuit, Budapest
 Euroring, Örkény, Pest megye
 Győr-Likócsi gokartpálya, Győr, Győr-Moson-Sopron megye

 Kakucsring, Kakucs, Pest megye
 Kaloring, Kalocsa, Bács-Kiskun megye
 Kamaraerdei Tanpálya, Budapest
 Kecskemét gokartpálya, Kecskemét
 Kiskunlacházai Szinkronpálya, Kiskunlacháza, Pest megye
 Kiskunlacházi Reptér, Kiskunlacháza, Pest megye
 Magyar Nemzetkozi Motodrome, Hajdúnánás
 Mezőkövesdi Reptér, Mezőkövesd, Borsod-Abaúj-Zemplén megye
 Népliget Street Circuit, Népliget, Budapest
 Nyírádi Motorsport Centrum, Nyírád, Veszprém megye
 Pannónia-Ring, Ostffyasszonyfa
 Pusztaottlaka-Ladakrossz, Pusztaottlaka, Békés megye
 Rába-ring, Écs
 Rabócsi-Ring, Rabócs, Szabolcs-Szatmár-Bereg megye
 Taszári Reptér, Taszár, Somogy megye
 Tökölring, Tököli Reptér, Tököl, Pest megye
 Veszprém-Szentkirályszabadja Reptér, Veszprém-Szentkirályszabadja, Veszprém megye
 Visonta Gokarland, Gyöngyösvisonta, Heves megye

India

Permanent tracks

 Irungattukottai Race Track, Sriperumbudur, Chennai
 Kari Motor Speedway, Coimbatore

Street circuits
 Hyderabad Street Circuit, Hyderabad

Inactive tracks
 Sholavaram Airstrip, Chennai

New Racetracks (Under Construction)
 Nanoli Speedway, [Pune, Maharashtra]
 Marque One, [Kotapalle, Andhra Pradesh]
 Pista Motor Raceway, [Hyderabad, Telangana]
 Coimbatore Auto Sports Transportation Trust (CoASTT)High Performance Centre,[Coimbatore, Tamil Nadu]

Indonesia

Permanent circuits
 Balipat Circuit, Tapin
 Bongohulawa Circuit, Gorontalo
 Boyolali City Circuit, Boyolali
 Bumi Rahayu Circuit, Bulungan
 Bukit Peusar Circuit, Tasikmalaya
 Cibatu Circuit, Majalengka
 Gelora Bung Tomo Circuit, Surabaya
 Gery-Mang Circuit, Subang
 Jaya Abadi Circuit, Lampung
 Jhonlin Circuit, Tanah Bambu
 Kuala Tungkal Circuit, Jambi
 Lanay Jaya Circuit, East Kutai
 Marido Circuit, Tabalong
 Mijen Circuit, Semarang
 Nanga-Nanga Circuit, Southeast Sulawesi
 Padang Panjang Manna Circuit, Bengkulu
 Pancing Circuit IMI, Medan
 Sabaru Circuit, Pontianak
 Salan Circuit, Samarinda
 Sawahlunto Circuit, Sawahlunto
 Selagalas Circuit, Mataram City

 Soewondo Air Force Base Circuit, Medan
 Sirkuit Manggul, Lahat
 Sirkuit Puncak Mario, Sidenreng Rappang
 Skyland Circuit, Musi Banyuasin
 Sport Center GOR Wergu, Kudus City
 Sumber Alam Circuit, Purworejo
 Tembong Jaya Circuit, Serang
 Temindung Airport Circuit, Samarinda
 Widuri Beach Circuit, Pemalang

Street circuits
 Alun-Alun Tegal Circuit, Tegal
 Bandungan Convention Center, Semarang
 BSD City Street Circuit, BSD City, South Tangerang
 Idi Regency Government Centre Circuit, East Aceh
 Jakarta International e-Prix Circuit, Ancol, North Jakarta
 Kajen City Square Street Track, Pekalongan

 Sirkuit Alun-Alun Kebumen, Kebumen
 Sirkuit Alun-Alun Purbalingga, Purbalingga
 Sirkuit Alun-Alun Wonosobo, Wonosobo
 Sirkuit GOR Satria, Purwokerto

Former track
 Jaya Ancol Circuit, Ancol, Jakarta (defunct) 
 Ria Kenjeran Park Circuit, Surabaya (defunct)
 Lippo Village Street Circuit, Lippo Karawaci, Tangerang (defunct)

Ireland

Republic of Ireland
Permanent circuits
 Mondello Park, County Kildare
Ovals
 Tipperary Raceway, Rosegreen, Tipperary
 Waterford Raceway, Dungarvan
 Coolronan Raceway, Ballivor, Meath
Road circuits
 Skerries Road Racing Circuit, County Dublin
Kart circuits
 Kartworld, Watergrasshill, County Cork
 Pallas Karting, Tynagh, County Galway
 Whiteriver Park, Louth
Defunct 
 The Curragh, County Kildare
 Phoenix Park Grand Prix Circuit, Dublin

Northern Ireland
 Bishopscourt Racing Circuit, County Down
 Kirkistown Circuit, County Down
 Nutts Corner Raceway, Antrim
 Tullyroan Oval, Armagh
 Coleraine - The Triangle, County Londonderry, North West 200.
 Dundrod Circuit, County Antrim.
 Clady Circuit, County Antrim.
 Lake Torrent, Tyrone, 2018 failed project.
 Benbradagh.
 Cairncastle.
 Cultra, Holywood, County Down.
 Drumhorc.
 Craigantlet.
 Kirkistown

Isle of Man
 Billown Circuit
 Clypse Course
 Four Inch Course
 Highroads Course

 St. John's Short Course
 Jurby

Italy

Street circuits
 Circuito Cittadino dell'EUR, Rome
 Circuito Cittadino di Cagliari, Cagliari
 Circuito del Garda, Salò
 Circuito delle Caldaie, Ascoli Piceno
 Circuito di Ospedaletti, Ospedaletti
 Montenero Circuit, Livorno

 Sempione Park Circuit, Milan
 Valentino Park Circuit, Turin

Non-permanent circuits
 Autodromo di Vairano, Pavia

Permanent circuits
 Adria International Raceway, Adria
 Autodromo del Levante, Binetto
 Autodromo del Sele, Battipaglia
 Autodromo dell'Umbria, Magione
 Autodromo di Anagni, Anagni
 Autodromo di Franciacorta, Castrezzato
 Autodromo di Mores, Mores
 Autodromo di Pergusa, Enna
 Autodromo di Siracusa, Siracusa

 Autodromo Piero Taruffi (ACI Vallelunga Circuit), Campagnano di Roma
 Autodromo Riccardo Paletti, Varano de' Melegari
 Autodromo Valle dei Templi, Racalmuto
 Circuito di Cellole, Cellole
 Circuito di Collemaggio, L'Aquila
 Circuito di Fiorano, Fiorano Modenese
 Circuito di Lombardore, Lombardore
 Circuito di Torretta, Torretta

Historic circuits
 Mellaha Lake, Italian Tripolitania, now in Libya
 Modena Autodrome, Modena
 Nardò Ring, Nardò
 Tripoli, Italian Tripolitania, now in Libya

Japan

 Asama Kazan, Tsumagoi, Gunma Prefecture
 Asan Circuit, Miyoshi District, Tokushima, Tokushima Prefecture, Shikoku
 Autopolis, Hita District, Ōita Prefecture
 Central Circuit, Taka District, Hyōgo Prefecture
 Ebisu Circuit, Nihonmatsu, Fukushima Prefecture,

 Honda Safety & Riding Plaza Kyūshū, Kikuchi District, Kumamoto Prefecture
 Inagawa Circuit, Inagawa, Kawabe District, Hyōgo Prefecture
 Nasu Motor Sports Land, Kuroiso, Tokushima, Tochigi Prefecture
 Nakayama Circuit, Wake District, Okayama Prefecture
 Nihonkai Maze Circuit, Nishikanbara District, Niigata Prefecture

 Sendai Hi-Land Raceway, Aoba-ku, Sendai, Miyagi Prefecture
 Sportsland SUGO, Murata, Miyagi Prefecture
 SPA Naoiri, Naoiri, Ōita Prefecture
 Spa Nishiura Motor Park, Gamagōri, Aichi Prefecture

 Tokachi International Speedway, Sarabetsu, Hokkaido
 Tsukuba Circuit, Shimotsuma, Ibaraki Prefecture

Inactive circuits
 Mine Circuit, Mine, Yamaguchi Prefecture
 Yatabe Test Track, Tsukuba, Ibaraki Prefecture
 Hokkaido Speed Park, Kutchan, Abuta District, Shiribeshi, Hokkaido
 Tamagawa speed way Kawasaki City Kanagawa Prefecture

Jersey
 Bouley Bay, Jersey

Kazakhstan

Kuwait
 Kuwait Motor Town, Ali Sabah Al Salem, Ahmadi Governorate

Latvia
 Biķernieki Complex Sports Base, Biķernieki district, Riga, Home of the 1000km Grand Prix Riga endurance race.
 333 sports base, Near Ropaži, Riga district. Popular event place and drift track.

Lithuania
 Nemuno Žiedas, Kačerginė
 Palangos trasa, Palanga
 Vilkyčiai Circuit, Šilutė

Luxembourg
 Circuit Goodyear, Colmar-Berg
 Findel, site of the 1950s Luxembourg Grand Prix

Macau
 Guia Circuit, Macau (see also Macau Grand Prix)

Malaysia

Permanent tracks

 Malacca International Motorsport Circuit, Ayer Keroh
 Dato Sagor Circuit, Pasir Salak, Perak D.R

Street tracks
 Klang Street Circuit, Klang
 Kuala Lumpur Street Circuit, Kuala Lumpur
 Putrajaya Street Circuit, Putrajaya

Former track

Mexico

Active tracks
 Autódromo de León, León, Guanajuato, Guanajuato
 Autódromo de Pachuca, Pachuca, Hidalgo
 Autódromo del Águila, Morelia, Michoacán
 Autódromo Durango, Durango, Durango
 Autódromo Guadalajara (also known as Autódromo Hermanos Gallo, Autódromo Toluquilla), Guadalajara, Jalisco

 Autódromo Internacional de Zacatecas, Zacatecas, Zacatecas
 Autódromo La Cantera, Chihuahua, Chihuahua
 Autódromo Miguel E. Abed, Amozoc, Puebla
 Autódromo Monterrey, Monterrey, Nuevo León
 Autódromo Potosino, San Luis Potosí, San Luis Potosí
 Autódromo San Luis 400, San Luis Potosí, San Luis Potosí
 Autódromo Torreón, Torreón, Coahuila
 Cancún Street Circuit, Cancún, Quintana Roo
 Centro Dinámico Pegaso, Toluca, Estado de México
 Circuito Motokart, Tehuacán, Puebla
 EcoCentro Expositor Querétaro, Querétaro, Querétaro
 Ovalo Aguascalientes México, Aguascalientes, Aguascalientes
 Súper Óvalo Chiapas, Tuxtla Gutiérrez, Chiapas

Former street courses
 Circuito de las Américas, Cancún, Quintana Roo
 Circuito "T" Adatiz, Atizapán, Estado de México

Former tracks
 Autódromo de Saltillo, Saltillo, Coahuila
 Fundidora Park, Monterrey, Nuevo León
 Trióvalo Bernardo Obregón, Guadalajara, Jalisco

Monaco

Morocco

Historic circuits
 Agadir Circuit

 Anfa Circuit
 Casablanca Street Circuit

Street circuit
 Marrakech Street Circuit, Marrakech

Mozambique

Inactive circuits
 Circuito de Lourenço Marques, Maputo
 Lourenço Marques street circuit, Maputo

Namibia

Permanent circuits
 Tony Rust Raceway, Windhoek, Khomas

Netherlands
 ACON Circuit, Sint Maarten

 De Polderputten, Ter Apel
 Eurocircuit, Valkenswaard
 JaBa Circuit, Posterholt
 Midland Circuit Lelystad, Lelystad
 Raceway Venray, Venray
 Speedway Emmen, Emmen
 Blauwhuis Speedway, Blauwhuis

New Zealand

Street circuits
 Cemetery Circuit, Wanganui (a.k.a. Southern Hemisphere's Isle of Man)
 Dunedin Street Circuit, Dunedin (see also Southern Festival of Speed)
 Greymouth Street Circuit, Greymouth, New Zealand
 Paeroa Street Circuit, Paeroa (a.k.a. Battle of the Streets)
 Port Nelson Street Circuit, Nelson

Permanent circuits
 Bruce McLaren Motorsport Park, Taupo
 Circuit Chris Amon (Manfeild), Feilding
 Hampton Downs Motorsport Park, North Waikato
 Highlands Motorsport Park, Cromwell
 Mike Pero Motorsport Park, Christchurch
 Teretonga Park, Invercargill
 Timaru International Motor Raceway (levels), Timaru

Drag strips
 Fram Autolite Dragway, Meremere
 Masterton Motorplex, Masterton
 Motueka Aerodrome, Motueka
 Powerbuilt Raceway at Ruapuna Park, Christchurch
 Taupo Motorsport Park, Taupo

Inactive tracks
 Hamilton Street Circuit, Hamilton City (a.k.a. Hamilton 400)
 Wellington Street Circuit, Wellington City (see also Wellington 500)
 Wigram Airfield Circuit, Christchurch (see also Tasman Series)
 Pukekohe Park Raceway, Pukekohe

Historic tracks
 Ardmore, South Auckland (circuit/drag racing)
 Bay Park Raceway, Tauranga (circuit racing)
 Kerrs Road, Wiri (drag racing)
 Muriwai Beach, Muriwai
 Napier Airport (drag racing)
 Thunderpark, Hastings (drag racing)

Norway

 Arctic Circle Raceway, Mo i Rana
 Fjord Motorpark, Karmøy, (under construction)
 Motorcenter Norway (also known as KNA Raceway)
 Lånkebanen, Hell
 Rudskogen Motorsenter, Rakkestad
 Vålerbanen, Våler

Drag strips
 Gardermoen Raceway, Gardermoen

Frozen lake circuits (Norwegian Grand Prix)
 Bogstad
 Gjersjøen, Oppegård
 Lake Mjøsa

Pakistan
 2f2f Formula Karting, Islamabad
 Bahria Mini F-1 Track, Islamabad
 Karakoram Motors Grand Prix, Rawalpindi
 Mountain Dew Drag Event, Karachi
 Cholistan Desert Jeep Rally, Cholistan Desert

Peru
 Autódromo La Chutana, Pucusana
 Autódromo de Tacna, Tacna

Philippines

Permanent tracks
 Batangas Racing Circuit, Rosario, Batangas
 Carmona Racing Circuit, Carmona, Cavite
 Clark International Speedway, Angeles City
 Pampanga International Circuit, Porac, Pampanga
 Tarlac Circuit Hill, San Jose, Tarlac

Inactive tracks
 Subic International Raceway, Subic Bay Freeport Zone (closed August 2010)

Poland

Permanent Circuits
 Tor Poznań, Poznań
 Autodrom Słomczyn, Słomczyn
 , Toruń
 Tor Krzywa, Osła
 Autodrom Jastrząb, Radom
 Silesia Ring, Kamień Śląski
 Tor Łódź, Łódź
 , Kielce
 , Częstochowa

Inactive circuits
 Pixers Ring, Osła
 Magnolia Circuit, Szczecin

Portugal

Permanent circuits

 Circuito Vasco Sameiro, Braga

Street circuits
 Circuito Internacional de Vila Real, Vila Real

Inactive tracks

Puerto Rico

Drag strips 
 Autoódromo José "Cheo" Gómez, Arecibo
 Rio Drag Park, Juana Díaz

Speedways 
 Autódromo Rafael Hernández Colón, Ponce
 Salinas Speedway, Salinas

Qatar

Russia

Permanent circuits
 Autodrom Moscow, Moscow
 Autodrom Saint Petersburg, Saint Petersburg
 Fort Grozny Autodrom, Grozny
 Igora Drive, Sosnovo
 Kazan Ring, Kazan
 Moscow Raceway, Moscow
 NRING Circuit, Nizhny Novgorod
 Primring, Artyom, Russia (under construction)
 Red Ring, Krasnoyarsk
 Simbirskiy Sport Park, Ulyanovsk (under construction)
 Smolensk Ring, Smolensk

Street circuits
 Kurskaya Curve (Kurskaya Duga), Kursk
 Lipetskiy Climb (Lipetsky Podjom), Lipetsk
 Neva Ring (Nevskoe Ring), Saint Petersburg

 Togliatti Ring, Togliatti

Romania

Permanent circuits

Transilvania Motor Ring, Cerghid, Mureș County, Nr 1/G
Motorpark Romania

Street circuits
 Bucharest Ring, Bucharest

Saudi Arabia

Riyadh
 Reem International Circuit, Riyadh
 Dirab Motorsport Park, Riyadh
 Riyadh Street Circuit

Jeddah

 Jeddah Raceway, Jeddah
 Desert Rally Jeddah, Jeddah

Other cities
 Ha'il Desert Rally venue, Ha'il
 Formula Kart race track, Dammam
 Range Rover Empty Quarter Desert Crossing, Rub' al Khali

Senegal
 Circuit de Dakar Baobabs, Thiès Region

Serbia

Temporary circuits
 Mišeluk, Novi Sad
 Kragujevac
 Batajnica Air Base, Batajnica
 Ušće, Belgrade
 Kalemegdan Park, Belgrade (1939 Belgrade Grand Prix)

Permanent circuits
 Beranovac, Kraljevo
 NAVAK, Subotište

Singapore

 Thomson Road Grand Prix circuit
 Changi Racing Circuit (under construction)

Slovakia

Permanent track
 Slovakiaring, Orechová Potôň

Street tracks
Piešťany Airfield Circuit, Piešťany

South Africa

Street tracks
 Cape Town Street Circuit, Cape Town
 Durban street circuit, Durban

Permanent tracks
 Blue Circle Raceway, Lichtenburg
 Red Star Raceway, Delmas
 Killarney Motor Racing Complex (WPMC), Cape Town

 Midvaal Raceway, Gauteng—Previously Race-Rite Raceway, Gauteng
 Aldo Scribante Circuit, Port Elizabeth
 Zwartkops Raceway, Pretoria, Gauteng

Drag strips
 Tarlton International Raceway, Krugersdorp

Inactive tracks
 Roy Hesketh Circuit, Pietermaritzburg
 WesBank Raceway, Gauteng

Kart tracks
 Celso Scribante Kart Track, Port Elizabeth
 iDube, KZN
 Vereeniging Kart Circuit, Gauteng

South Korea

Permanent circuits

 Everland Speedway, Yongin, Gyeonggi-do
 Inje Speedium, Inje, Gangwon-do

 Taebaek Racing Park, Gangwon-do

Street circuits
 Seoul Street Circuit, Seoul

Former street circuit

 Changwon Street Circuit, Gyeongsangnam-do

Spain

Permanent circuits
 Circuit d'Alcarràs, Alcarràs
 Circuito Ascari, Ronda

 Circuit de Calafat, L'Ametlla de Mar
 Circuito de Albacete, Albacete
 Circuito de Almería, Tabernas, Almería
 Circuito de Velocidad de Cartagena, Cartagena
 Circuito Guadix, Granada

 Circuito La Torrica, Fuente Álamo de Murcia
 Circuito Islas Canarias, Telde, Gran Canaria
 Circuito de Navarra, Los Arcos

 Mallorca RennArena, L'Arenal, (Palma de Mallorca)
 Monteblanco, Huelva
 Parcmotor Castellolí, Castellolí (Barcelona)

Test circuits
 Ascari Race Resort, Ronda
 Idiada Test Track, Santa Oliva, Tarragona

Rallycross circuits
 Ciudad Deportiva Islas Canarias, Telde, Gran Canaria

Inactive circuits
 Bilbao Street Circuit, Bilbao
 Guadalope, Alcañiz
 Guadarrama, Madrid
 Lasarte, Lasarte-Oria
 Llevant, Mataró, Vilassar de Mar, Argentona (Catalunya)

 Sitges Terramar, Sitges (Barcelona)
 Tarragona, Tarragona

 Villafranca, Villafranca (Valencia)

Sweden

Street circuits
 Göteborg City Race

 Norra Vram
 Solvalla Stockholm

Permanent circuits

 Drivecenter Arena, Fällfors
 Falkenbergs Motorbana, Vinberg
 Gotland Ring, Kappelshamn

 Kinnekulle Ring, Kinnekulle
 Ljungbyheds motorbana, Ljungbyhed
 Mantorp Park, Mantorp
 Mittsverigebanan, Härnösand
 Ring Knutstorp, Helsingborg
 Sturup Raceway, Malmö
 Svistads Motorstadion, Linköping
 Tierp Arena, Tierp

Frozen lake circuits
 Lake Rämen

Switzerland

Permanent circuits
 Buochs
 Hittnau
 Lignières, Switzerland

Hillclimbs
 Ayent-Anzère
 Gurnigel
 La Roche-La Berra
 St. Ursanne-Les Rangiers

Street circuits
 Bern Street Circuit, Bern

 Zürich Street Circuit, Zürich

Taiwan

 Lihpao International Circuit, Taichung

Inactive tracks

 Penbay International Circuit, Donggang, Pingtung

Thailand
 Bangkok Street Circuit, Bangkok
 Bangsaen Street Circuit, Chonburi Province
 Bira Circuit, Chonburi Province

 Kaeng Krachan Circuit, Phetchaburi Province
 Thailand Circuit, Nakhon Pathom Province

Turkey

Istanbul Hezarfen Airfield, Çatalca

İzmir Park, İzmir
İzmit Körfez Circuit, Körfez, Kocaeli

Ukraine

Permanent circuits
 Autodrome Chaika, Chaiky
 Crimea Grand Prix Circuit, Suvorovske (on hold)

Street circuits
 Galring, Lviv
 Lvivskyi Triangle, Lviv

United Arab Emirates
 Dubai Autodrome, Dubai

United Kingdom

Permanent circuits

 Anglesey Circuit, Aberffraw, Anglesey
 Bedford Autodrome, Bedfordshire
 Blyton, Gainsborough, Lincolnshire

 Cadwell Park, Lincolnshire
 Castle Combe Circuit, Castle Combe, Wiltshire
Central Park, Cowdenbeath, Fife
 Circuit of Wales, Ebbw Vale, Blaenau Gwent
 Croft Circuit, North Yorkshire
 Darley Moor Airfield, Derbyshire

 East Fortune, East Lothian
 Goodwood Motor Racing Circuit, West Sussex
 Knockhill, Fife
 Llandow Circuit, Vale of Glamorgan
 Lydden, Canterbury, Kent
 Mallory Park, Leicestershire
 Nutts Corner, Belfast
 Oliver's Mount, North Yorkshire
 Oulton Park, Cheshire
 Pembrey Circuit, Pembrey, Carmarthenshire
 Santa Pod Raceway, Podington, Bedfordshire

 Snetterton Circuit, Norfolk
 Thruxton, Hampshire
 Tonfanau, Gwynedd

Street circuits
 New Brighton, Wirral
 Tandragee, County Antrim, Tandragee 100 race
 Battersea Park Street Circuit, London

Inactive circuits
 Beveridge Park, Kirkcaldy 1948–1988
 Blandford circuit, Blandford Military Camp, Dorset Used for club racing in between 1948 and 1950. 3.5 mile long
 Birmingham Superprix, Birmingham 1986–1990
 Boreham Circuit, Chelmsford 1949–1953
 Brooklands circuit, Weybridge, Surrey Superspeedway 1907–1939.
 Brough Circuit, East Riding of Yorkshire 1949–1957
 Catterick Circuit, North Yorkshire 1958–1963
 Crystal Palace Circuit Used from 1927 to 1972, currently active for annual Sprint event using part of previous circuits.
 Davidstow Circuit, cornwall 1953–1955
 Debden Circuit, Saffron Walden, Essex 1962–1965, although still active Sprint venue
 Fersfield, Diss, Norfolk 1951–1952
 Full Sutton Circuit, Yorkshire 1958
 Ingliston, Edinburgh 1965–1994, although still active for club events and driving experience days.
 Gamston, Nottinghamshire 1950–1951
 Gransden Lodge Airfield, Cambridgeshire 1946–1947
 Ibsley Circuit, Hampshire 1951–1955
 Linton-on-Ouse, Yorkshire 1960–1961
 Longridge circuit, Preston, Lancashire 1973–1978
 Lulsgate Aerodrome, Bristol 1949–1950
 Pebsham Circuit, 1956/7 planning application submit to Hastings and Bexhill Councils
 Rockingham Motor Speedway, Corby, Northamptonshire

Hillclimb venues
 [[Barbon Manor]]
 Baitings Dam, Ripponden, Yorkshire
 Bo'ness
 Chateau Impney
 Cultra, Holywood, County Down
 Doune
 Eagle's Rock
 Fintray
 Forrestburn
 Harewood
 Gurston Down
 Loton Park
 Llys-y-Fran
 Prescott
 Oliver's Mount
 Longleat
 Shelsley Walsh
 Scammonden Dam
 Tregrehan
 Werrington
 Wiscombe Park

Sprint venues
 Abingdon, Dalton Barracks, Abingdon
 [[Aintree]]
 Alford Grampian Transport Museum
 Anglesey (Ty Croes)
 Barkston Heath
 Bentwaters Park
 Bishopscourt
 Blyton, Gainsborough
 Boyndie, 3 miles west of Banff
 Brawdy, 12 miles west of Haverfordwest
 Carnaby
 Castle Combe Circuit, near Chippenham
 Chivenor, North Devon
 Colerne Airfield
 Curborough
 Debden
 Dunkeswell
 Elvington
 Golspie
 Hethel, Group Lotus test track, near Wymondham
 Kames
 Llandow, South Wales
 Longcross, near Chertsey
 MIRA
 New Brighton
 North Weald airfield, Essex
 Rushmoor Arena, near Aldershot, Hampshire
 Thorseby Park
 Three Sisters
 Top Gear test track, Dunsfold Aerodrome, Surrey

Drag racing venues
Long Marston Airfield, Stratford-upon-Avon Closed 2018
Santa Pod Raceway, Podington, Bedfordshire
York Raceway, Pocklington
Elvington Airfield, RAF Elvington, North Yorkshire

United States

Dirt Racing Ovals in the United States

Uruguay

 Autódromo Eduardo Prudêncio Cabrera, Rivera
 Autódromo Víctor Borrat Fabini, El Pinar
 Punta del Este Street Circuit, Punta del Este

Vietnam

 Hanoi Street Circuit, Hanoi

Venezuela
 Autódromo Internacional Pancho Pepe Cróquer, Turagua, Aragua

Inactive circuits

Zimbabwe

 Belvedere Airfield, Belvedere
 Breedon Everard Raceway, Bulawayo
 Donnybrook Raceway, Harare
 James McNeillie Circuit, Bulawayo

See also
 Road racing
 Street circuit
 Oval track racing
 List of motor racing venues by capacity
 List of motor racing circuits by FIA Grade

References

External links
 RacingCircuits.info world motor racing circuits guide
 Trackpedia's listing of world tracks with racing and driving guides
 Interactive map of all current major race tracks in North America
 The list of motor racing in Google Maps
 Locations and links to UK racing, hillclimb and sprint circuits
 AudioTrackGuides.co.uk Audio walkthroughs of motor racing circuits, for use with games.

Tracks